Itchingfield is a small village and civil parish in the Horsham district of West Sussex, England.

The main settlement in the parish is Barns Green.

The village's origins may lie with the Romans. This is suggested by the discovery of tiles in the parish.

Gallery

References

External links

Horsham District
Villages in West Sussex